Acmena was formerly the name of a genus of shrubs and trees in the myrtle family Myrtaceae. The genus was first formally described in 1828 by Augustin Pyramus de Candolle in his Prodromus Systematis Naturalis Regni Vegetabilis.

The species included:
Acmena divaricata, now a synonym of Syzygium divaricatum (Merr. & L.M.Perry) Craven & Biffin 
Acmena graveolens, now a synonym of Syzygium graveolens (F.M.Bailey) Craven & Biffin 
Acmena hemilampra, now a synonym of Syzygium hemilamprum (F.Muell.) Craven & Biffin 
Acmena ingens, now a synonym of Syzygium ingens (F.Muell. ex C.Moore) Craven & Biffin  
Acmena macrocarpa, now a synonym of Syzygium graveolens (F.M.Bailey) Craven & Biffin  
Acmena resa, now a synonym of Syzygium resa (B.Hyland) Craven & Biffin 
Acmena smithii, now a synonym of Syzygium smithii (Poir.) Nied.

References

Myrtaceae genera
Myrtaceae